was a rock and pop singer in Japan, born in Moscow, Soviet Union.

Family background 
Her father was a Japanese expatriate in the Soviet Union,  while her mother was a Russian. The family moved to Japan when she was 11 years old, where she was subjected to repeated bullying. Bullied in elementary school and middle school, she attempted to commit suicide on multiple occasions. One time, when she was an elementary school girl, she broke both arm bones by herself, with the intention of skipping school. She used this as a stepping stone to enter the music industry.

Career

She released her first single, "Zoo", at the age of 17 in 1988. She then made her debut with the album "Zoo" in 1988. In 1990 she had a hit with "Kamisama ga Oritekuru Yoru" and the following year with the often-covered "Tsubasa wo Kudasai." That year she made the first of several movie appearances in "Tokyo Kyujitsu." From the mid-1990s, she split her time between New York and Japan, and got involved in the club scene in the late 1990s. She married SOBUT guitarist Motoaki in 1999 and had a daughter in 2001, but they were soon separated.

Illness and death 
In 2004, she was diagnosed with breast cancer, and became a spokeswoman for cancer activism. She and Motoaki divorced in 2007. In October 2008, she wrote on her blog that the cancer had returned and spread to her bones and lungs. That year she took on a busy schedule, performing concerts, publishing a book and releasing "K," her first original album in 13 years. She died from the disease in Tokyo in 2009, aged 38.

An Orthodox Christian, her panikhída (memorial service) was held on July 30, and her funeral the next day at the Japanese Orthodox Church's Holy Resurrection Cathedral. Her Christian name was Anastasia.

Discography
Zoo (1988)
Campfire (1989)
Hippies (1990)
Church (1991)
Weed (1992)
Beata (1995)
Banbita (1996)
Kaori Kawamura Best Collection (2008)
K (2009)
Message: Last Live 2009.05.05 (2010)

References

External links 
 Rock Singer Kaori Kawamura Dies of Cancer at 38 Japan Today, July 29, 2009.
  - Bells of the cathedral after the funeral

1971 births
2009 deaths
Deaths from cancer in Japan
Deaths from breast cancer
Japanese women pop singers
Japanese women rock singers
Russian and Soviet emigrants to Japan
Singers from Tokyo
Eastern Orthodox Christians from Japan
20th-century Japanese women singers
20th-century Japanese singers
21st-century Japanese women singers
21st-century Japanese singers